Nebojša Mezei (born 15 February 1991) is a Serbian football defender who plays for Bačka 1901.

Club career
Born in Subotica, Mezei was a member of FK Partizan youth categories. He started his senior career with Voždovac. After the 2009–10 season, he spent in the Serbian League Belgrade scoring 2 goals on 24 matches, Mezei left the club and returned to his home town. Mezei joined Serbian SuperLiga side Spartak Subotica in 2010. During the first season with the club, he noted 5 appearances at total. As he did not make any official appearance in the first half of the 2011–12 season, Mezei was loaned to Radnički Sombor in the winter-break. He collected all 17 matches in the second half-season in the Serbian First League, scoring a goal in the 26 fixture match against Kolubara. Previously, he was also marked as the man of the match in 19 fixture, when he assisted to Miroslav Paunović for 1–0 victory against Radnički Niš. Later, same year, he was also loaned to Palić. After he spent the whole 2012 loaning out, Mezei returned in Spartak Subotica at the beginning of 2013 and signed a new four-year contract with club. Having a limited minutage, Mezei was mostly used as a back-up player in a period between 2013 and 2015. He started the 2015–16 Serbian SuperLiga season as a first squad player, but later injured and the rest of season out of the field. He was also with the team at the beginning of 2016–17 season, but terminated the contract shortly after and moved to ČSK Čelarevo.

Career statistics

References

External links
 Nebojša Mezei stats at utakmica.rs 
 
 
 

1991 births
Living people
Sportspeople from Subotica
Association football defenders
Serbian footballers
FK Voždovac players
FK Spartak Subotica players
FK Radnički Sombor players
FK Palić players
FK ČSK Čelarevo players
FK TSC Bačka Topola players
FK Bačka 1901 players
Serbian First League players
Serbian SuperLiga players